Benoît Leroy (born 28 July 1982) is a retired French football midfielder.

Career
Leroy previously played for Championnat de France Amateurs side Racing Besançon and Ligue 2 side Niort, where he made his full professional debut in August 2006 in a 2–1 victory in which he scored the second goal.

References

External links

Benoît Leroy foot-national.com Profile

1982 births
Living people
People from Châteauroux
Racing Besançon players
Chamois Niortais F.C. players
French footballers
Association football midfielders
AJ Auxerre players
AS Cannes players
Association football forwards
Sportspeople from Indre
Footballers from Centre-Val de Loire